This is the list of landscape units located in Estonia. The list is incomplete.

References